Westgate is an English surname. Notable people with the surname include:

Brandon Westgate (born 1989), American skateboarder
Murray Westgate (born 1918), Canadian actor
Ross Westgate (born 1967), English journalist and businessman

English-language surnames